Nancy Golden (born 1951) is the first Professor of Practice in the College of Education at the University of Oregon. She has been a leader in education as Oregon's chief education officer, as former education policy advisor to Oregon Governor John Kitzhaber, and as Superintendent of Springfield School District.

Early life and education 
A native of Utica, New York, in 1973 Golden earned a B.S. in elementary education at the University of Denver. In 1974 she earned an M.S. in special education at the University of Oregon, with a specialization in severe cognitive disabilities and learning disabilities. She completed her dissertation, The Use of a Computer Networking System to Obtain and Analyze Group Responses during Classroom Lectures, for her 1987 Ph.D. in curriculum and instruction at the University of Oregon.

Golden is married to Roger Guthrie, and she has adult children and two grandchildren.

Career 
In 1974, Golden began working as a special education teacher in Eugene, Oregon. She then became director of educational support services for Eugene's schools, and from 1993 to 1997 she served as Albany School District assistant superintendent of instruction, where she was "responsible for updating instructional programs, selecting educational materials, overseeing educational research and assisting individual schools".

From 2003 to 2013 Golden was Superintendent of Springfield School District in Springfield, Oregon. She began to serve additionally as education policy advisor for Governor Kitzhaber in 2011, and she was named Chief Education Officer of the Oregon Education Investment Board in 2013, "charged with remaking education from preschool through grad school to dramatically increase how many Oregonians become well-educated." She retired from that position in 2015.

She is Professor of Practice, Educational Methodology, Policy and Leadership at the University of Oregon, and Director, Oregon Research Schools Network.

Selected publications 
 

 

 

 

 

 Walker, Hill M.; McDonnell, Scott; Holmes, Deborah; Todis, Bonnie; Walker, Jackie;  Golden, Nancy. "The ACCEPTS program: A curriculum for children's effective peer and teacher skills." Austin, TX: Pro-Ed, 1988.

 Golden, Nancy; DeMarco, Joyce. "Integrated PE Class: An Effective Way to Mainstream Handicapped Children in the Regular PE Class." BEST Center, Eugene, 1980. Oregon: ERIC Clearinghouse on Educational Management, 2000.

Awards 

 Oregon Superintendent of the Year Award, 2011
 Oregon Commission for Women, Women of Achievement Award presented in recognition of work to significantly improve the lives of women in Oregon, 2009.

References 

1951 births
Educators from Oregon
School superintendents in Oregon
Living people
University of Denver alumni
University of Oregon alumni
University of Oregon faculty
Educators from New York (state)
Special educators
Education writers
State superintendents of public instruction of the United States